6th of October Sports Club, in Egyptian (نادي 6 أكتوبر - الصفحة الرسمية), is an Egyptian sports club based in the city of 6th of October. Its basketball team plays in the Egyptian Basketball Super League. Home games are played in the 6th of October Sports Hall, which opened in 2020.

In October 2017, 6th of October promoted to the Egyptian Basketball Super League for the first time.

References

External links
Official website

Basketball teams in Egypt
Basketball teams established in 1984